Hora Proelefsis ((Homeland) is a 2010 Greek drama film directed by Syllas Tzoumerkas. It narrates the bitter consequences of an adoption on the members of a Greek family, in the frame of the political events of the country's post-junta era.

Hora Proelefsis had its world premiere at the International Critics' Week of the 67th Venice International Film Festival. It was released in Greek cinemas in October 2010 and participated in numerous international festivals (Tallinn Black Nights, Göteborg Film Festival, Istanbul, Mar Del Plata, Karlovy Vary Film Festival, New Horizons  etc.).

Cast
 Amalia Moutoussi
 Thanos Samaras
 Ioanna Tsirigouli
 Errikos Litsis
 Youla Boudali
 Ieronymos Kaletsanos
 Despina Georgakopoulou
 Nikos Flessas
 Marissa Triantafyllidou
 Maria Kallimani
 Alexandros Parissis
 Zoe Lianostathi
 Katerina Papageorgiou

Accolades

References

External links
 
 

2010 films
2010 drama films
Greek drama films
2010s Greek-language films